Cancer screening aims to detect cancer before symptoms appear. This may involve blood tests, urine tests, DNA tests, other tests, or medical imaging. The benefits of screening in terms of cancer prevention, early detection and subsequent treatment must be weighed against any harms.

Universal screening, also known as mass screening or population screening, involves screening everyone, usually within a specific age group. Selective screening identifies people who are known to be at higher risk of developing cancer, such as people with a family history of cancer.

Screening can lead to false positive results and subsequent invasive procedures. Screening can also lead to false negative results, where an existing cancer is missed. Controversy arises when it is not clear if the benefits of screening outweigh the risks of the screening procedure itself, and any follow-up diagnostic tests and treatments.

Screening tests must be effective, safe, well tolerated with acceptably low rates of false positive and false negative results. If signs of cancer are detected, more definitive and invasive follow-up tests are performed to reach a diagnosis. Screening for cancer can lead to cancer prevention and earlier diagnosis. Early diagnosis may lead to higher rates of successful treatment and extended life. However, it may also falsely appear to increase the time to death through lead time bias or length time bias.

Medical uses
Screening can help identify cancers at early stages. Good cancer screening would not be more likely to cause harm than to provide useful information. In general, cancer screening has risks and should not be done except with a medical indication.

Different kinds of cancer screening procedures have different risks, but good tests share some characteristics. If a test detects cancer, then that test result should also lead to options for treatment. Good tests come with a patient explanation of why that person has high enough risk of cancer to justify the test. Part of the testing experience is for the health care provider to explain how common false positive results are so that the patient can understand the context of their results. If multiple tests are available, then a screening test should be presented along with other options.

Risks
Screening for cancer is controversial in cases when it is not yet known if the test actually saves lives. Screening can lead to substantial false positive result and subsequent invasive procedures. The controversy arises when it is not clear if the benefits of screening outweigh the risks of follow-up diagnostic tests and cancer treatments. Cancer screening is not indicated unless life expectancy is greater than five years and the benefit is uncertain over the age of 70.

Several factors are considered to determine whether the benefits of screening outweigh the risks and the costs of screening. These factors include:
Possible harms from the screening test: Some types of screening tests, such as X-ray images, expose the body to potentially harmful ionizing radiation. There is a small chance that the radiation in the test could cause a new cancer in a healthy person. Screening mammography, used to detect breast cancer, is not recommended to men or to young women because they are more likely to be harmed by the test than to benefit from it. Other tests, such as a skin check for skin cancer, have no significant risk of harm to the patient. A test that has high potential harms is only recommended when the benefits are also high.
The likelihood of the test correctly identifying cancer: If the test is not sensitive, then it may miss cancers. If the test is not specific, then it may wrongly indicate cancer in a healthy person. All cancer screening tests produce both false positives and false negatives, and most produce more false positives. Experts consider the rate of errors when making recommendations about which test, if any, to use. A test may work better in some populations than others. The positive predictive value is a calculation of the likelihood that a positive test result actually represents cancer in a given individual, based on the results of people with similar risk factors.
The likelihood of cancer being present: Screening is not normally useful for rare cancers. It is rarely done for young people, since cancer is largely a disease found in people over the age of 50. Countries often focus their screening recommendations on the major forms of treatable cancer found in their population. For example, the United States recommends universal screening for colon cancer, which is common in the US, but not for stomach cancer, which is less common; by contrast, Japan recommends screening for stomach cancer, but not colon cancer, which is rarer in Japan. Screening recommendations depend on the individual's risk, with high-risk people receiving earlier and more frequent screening than low-risk people.
Possible harms from follow-up procedures: If the screening test is positive, further diagnostic testing is normally done, such as a biopsy of the tissue. If the test produces many false positives, then many people will undergo needless medical procedures, some of which may be dangerous.
Whether suitable treatment is available and appropriate: Screening is discouraged if no effective treatment is available. When effective and suitable treatment is not available, then diagnosis of a fatal disease produces significant mental and emotional harms. For example, routine screening for cancer is typically not appropriate in a very frail elderly person, because the treatment for any cancer that is detected might kill the patient.
Whether early detection improves treatment outcomes: Even when treatment is available, sometimes early detection does not improve the outcome. If the treatment result is the same as if the screening had not been done, then the only screening program does is increase the length of time the person lived with the knowledge that he had cancer. This phenomenon is called lead-time bias. A useful screening program reduces the number of years of potential life lost (longer lives) and disability-adjusted life years lost (longer healthy lives).
Whether the cancer will ever need treatment: Diagnosis of a cancer in a person who will never be harmed by the cancer is called overdiagnosis. Overdiagnosis is most common among older people with slow-growing cancers. Concerns about overdiagnosis are common for breast and prostate cancer.
Whether the test is acceptable to the patients:If a screening test is too burdensome, such as requiring too much time, too much pain, or culturally unacceptable behaviors, then people will refuse to participate.
Cost of the test: Some expert bodies, such as the United States Preventive Services Task Force, completely ignore the question of money. Most, however, include a cost-effectiveness analysis that, all else being equal, favors less expensive tests over more expensive tests, and attempt to balance the cost of the screening program against the benefits of using those funds for other health programs. These analyses usually include the total cost of the screening program to the healthcare system, such as ordering the test, performing the test, reporting the results, and biopsies for suspicious results, but not usually the costs to the individual, such as for time taken away from employment.
The extent to which a cancer is treatable: if a person has a low life expectancy or otherwise is in the end stages of a chronic condition, then such a patient may have a better life by ignoring the cancer even if one were found. If the diagnosis of cancer would not result in a change in care then cancer screening would not likely result in a positive outcome. Overdiagnosis in this case occurs, for example, in patients with end-stage renal disease and organizations recommend against cancer screening for such patients.

Attendance 
For detecting cancer early all eligible people need to go to screenings but disadvantaged groups face different barriers that lead to lower attendance rates.

People with mental illnesses are nearly 25% less likely to attend cancer screening appointments. Women with schizophrenia are the least likely to be screened. But even people with common mood disorders such as anxiety and depression are less likely to attend than the general population. The lower attendance numbers are thought to be one of the reasons why people with mental illnesses tend to die 15–20 years earlier than the general population.

In Northern Ireland women with mental health problems were shown to be less likely to attend screening for breast cancer, than women without. The lower attendance numbers remained the same even when marital status and social deprivation were taken into account.

People from minority ethnic communities are also less likely to attend cancer screening. In the UK, women of South Asian heritage are the least likely to attend breast cancer screening. Research is still needed to identify specific barriers for the different South Asian communities. For example, a study showed that British-Pakistani women faced cultural and language barriers and were not aware that breast screening takes place in a female-only environment.

Deprivation can also reduce the numbers of people attending cancer screening. A UK study showed that making the screening easily accessible increased take-up. Providing mobile screening units parked in supermarket car parks, for example, in the poorer areas of Manchester was an acceptable way of offering lung checks to high-risk groups such as smokers. A simple test measured obstruction to the flow of air in and out of the lungs. A third of the tests showed airflow obstruction, a sign of chronic obstructive pulmonary disease which is a risk factor for lung cancer and other health conditions.

By type

Breast cancer

Breast cancer screening is the medical screening of asymptomatic, apparently healthy women for breast cancer in an attempt to achieve an earlier diagnosis. The goal of early detection is to find the cancer when it is treatable.  A number of screening tests have been employed, including clinical and self breast exams, mammography, clinical breast exam, breast self-exam, thermography, tissue sampling and magnetic resonance imaging. Mammography is the method most commonly used for breast cancer screening for women who are 50 years and older. There are 3D mammograms now in use and for women who are at higher risk for breast cancer they can have an MRI.

In the US, risk factors for breast cancer are taken into consideration to decide if a screening test is needed and if so which is best for the person.

Many European countries have organised population-level screening programmes for breast cancer. In 2022, the European Commission's Scientific Advice Mechanism concluded that screening should be expanded to women in their mid-40s.

Cervical cancer

Cervical screening by the Pap test or other methods is highly effective at detecting and preventing cervical cancer, although there is a serious risk of overtreatment in young women up to the age of 20 or beyond, who are prone to have many abnormal cells which clear up naturally. There is a considerable range in the recommended age at which to begin screening around the world. According to the 2010 European guidelines for cervical cancer screening, the age at which to commence screening ranges between 20 and 30 years of age, "but preferentially not before age 25 or 30 years", depending on the burden of the disease in the population and the available resources.

In the United States the rate of cervical cancer is 0.1% among women under 20 years of age, so the American Cancer Society as well as the American College of Obstetricians and Gynecologists strongly recommend that screening begin at age 21, regardless of age at sexual initiation or other risk-related behaviors. For healthy women aged 21–29 who have never had an abnormal Pap smear, cervical cancer screening with cervical cytology (Pap smear) should occur every 3 years, regardless of HPV vaccination status. The preferred screening for women aged 30–65 is "co-testing", which includes a combination of cervical cytology screening and HPV testing, every 5 years. However, it is acceptable to screen this age group with a Pap smear alone every 3 years. In women over the age of 65, screening for cervical cancer may be discontinued in the absence of abnormal screening results within the prior 10 years and no history of CIN 2 or higher.

In 2022, the European Commission's Scientific Advice Mechanism concluded that improved cervical cancer screening, combined with widespread HPV vaccination, presented an opportunity to eliminate cervical cancer in Europe.

Bowel (colorectal) cancer

Screening for colorectal cancer, if done early enough, is preventive because almost all colorectal cancers originate from benign growths called polyps, which can be located and removed during a colonoscopy (see colonic polypectomy).

The US Preventive Services Task Force recommends screening for colorectal cancer using fecal occult blood testing, sigmoidoscopy, or colonoscopy, in adults, beginning at age 50 years and continuing until age 75 years. For people over 75 or those with a life expectancy of less than 10 years screening is not recommended. A new enzyme method for colorectal cancer screening is the M2-PK Test, which is able to detect bleeding and non-bleeding colorectal cancers and polyps. In 2008, Kaiser Permanente Colorado implemented a program that used automated calls and sends fecal immunochemical test kits to patients who are overdue for colorectal cancer screenings. The program has increased the proportion of all eligible members screened by 25 percent. Multi-Target Stool DNA Test (Cologuard) and Plasma SEPT9 DNA Methylation Test (Epi proColon) have been FDA-approved.

Colorectal cancer screening programmes are widespread in Europe. In England, adults are screened biennially via faecal occult blood testing between the ages of 60 and 74 years, and recently extended to the ages from 50 to 74. However, the current bowel cancer screening programme may miss a high proportion of cancers and high-risk polyps due to the threshold for further investigation. In March 2022, the European Commission's Scientific Advice Mechanism recommended improvements to screening frequency based on patients' age, sex, and previous results.

Prostate cancer

When screening for prostate cancer, the PSA test may detect small cancers that would never become life-threatening, but once detected will lead to treatment. This situation, called overdiagnosis, puts men at risk for complications from unnecessary treatment such as surgery or radiation. Follow up procedures used to diagnose prostate cancer (prostate biopsy) may cause side effects, including bleeding and infection. Prostate cancer treatment may cause incontinence (inability to control urine flow) and erectile dysfunction (erections inadequate for intercourse). As a result, in 2012, the United States Preventive Services Task Force (USPSTF) recommended against prostate-specific antigen (PSA) based screening for prostate cancer finding, "there is a very small potential benefit and significant potential harms" and concluding, "while everyone wants to help prevent deaths from prostate cancer, current methods of PSA screening and treatment of screen-detected cancer are not the answer." As of 2013, most North American medical groups recommended individualized decisions about screening, taking into consideration the risks, benefits, and the patients' personal preferences.

Similarly, Fenton's 2018 review (conducted for the USPSTF) focused on the two highest quality randomized control studies of the costs and benefits of PSA screening, and the findings illustrate the complex issues associated with cancer screening.  Fenton reports that the screening of 1,000 men every four years for 13 years reduces mortality from prostate cancer by just one.  More specifically, of those 1,000 men:  243 received an indication of cancer during PSA screening (most of whom then had a biopsy); of those, 3 had to be hospitalized for biopsy complications; 35 were diagnosed with prostate cancer (and thus the false alarm rate from the original PSA screening was >85%); of those 35, 3 avoided metastatic prostate cancer and 1 avoided death by prostate cancer while 9 developed impotence or urinary incontinence due to their treatment and 5 died due to prostate cancer despite being treated.  In their 2018 recommendations, the USPSTF estimates that 20%-50% of men diagnosed with prostate cancer following a positive PSA screening have cancer that, even if not treated, would never grow, spread, or harm them 

However, by 2022 the advent of new technologies, especially improved screening using blood tests, led the European Commission's Scientific Advice Mechanism to recommend organised population-level organised prostate cancer screening, concluding that the balance of harms and benefits had shifted.

Lung cancer

Screening studies for lung cancer have only been done in high risk populations, such as smokers and workers with occupational exposure to certain substances. Since 2010, recommendations by medical authorities are turning in favour of lung cancer screening, which is likely to become more widely available in the advanced economies.

In December 2013, the United States Preventive Services Task Force (USPSTF) changed its long-standing recommendation that there is insufficient evidence to recommend for or against screening for lung cancer to the following: "The USPSTF recommends annual screening for lung cancer with low-dose computed tomography in adults ages 55 to 80 years who have a 30 pack-year smoking history and currently smoke or have quit within the past 15 years. Screening should be discontinued once a person has not smoked for 15 years or develops a health problem that substantially limits life expectancy or the ability or willingness to have curative lung surgery".

Similarly, in March 2022, the European Commission's Scientific Advice Mechanism recommended lung screening for current and ex-smokers, combined with ongoing smoking cessation programmes.

Pancreatic cancer
Early detection of pancreatic cancer biomarkers was accomplished using SERS-based immunoassay approach. A SERS-base multiplex proteinbiomarker detection platform in a microfluidic chip to detect is used to detect several protein biomarkers to predict the type of disease and critical biomarkers and increase the chance of diagnosis between diseases with similar biomarkers (PC, OVC, and pancreatitis).
It is generally agreed that general screening of large groups for pancreatic cancer is not at present likely to be effective, and outside clinical trials there are no programmes for this. The European Society for Medical Oncology recommends regular screening with endoscopic ultrasound and MRI/CT imaging for those at high risk from inherited genetics, in line with other recommendations, which may also include CT. For screening, special CT scanning procedures may be used, such as multiphase CT scan.

For average at-risk populations, routine screening for pancreatic cancer is currently not recommended.

Oral cancer

The US Preventive Services Task Force (USPSTF) in 2013 found that evidence was insufficient to determine the balance of benefits and harms of screening for oral cancer in adults without symptoms by primary care providers. The American Academy of Family Physicians comes to similar conclusions while the American Cancer Society recommends that adults over 20 years who have periodic health examinations should have the oral cavity examined for cancer. The American Dental Association recommends that providers remain alert for signs of cancer during routine examinations. Oral cancer screening is also recommended by some groups of dental hygienists.

Other cancers
There is insufficient evidence to recommend for or against screening for skin cancer, and bladder cancer. Routine screening is not recommended for testicular cancer and ovarian cancer.

Research

Whole body imaging
Full body CT scans are available for cancer screening, but this type of medical imaging to search for cancer in people without clear symptoms can create problems such as increased exposure to ionizing radiation. However, magnetic resonance imaging (MRI) scans are not associated with a radiation risk, and MRI scans are being evaluated for their use in cancer screening. There is a significant risk of detection of what has been called incidentalomas - benign lesions that may be interpreted as a cancer and put patients at potential risk by undergoing follow-up procedures.

References

Further reading

External links 
NHS cancer screening programmes
Screening for cancer, Cancer Research UK
Cancer screening overview, National Cancer Institute
Cancer Screening at eMedicine
ColonCancerCheck including fact sheets in 24 languages at Ontario Ministry of Health and Long-Term Care
How screening recommendations have changed over time from the American Cancer Society